The Gross Fusshorn is a mountain of the Bernese Alps, overlooking the Oberaletsch Glacier in the canton of Valais. The Fusshörner are a group of peaks located on the south ridge of the Gross Fusshorn. On the east side lies a glacier named Driestgletscher.

References

External links
 Gross Fusshorn on Hikr
 Fusshörner on Hikr

Mountains of the Alps
Alpine three-thousanders
Mountains of Switzerland
Mountains of Valais
Bernese Alps